Bright is a civil parish in York County, New Brunswick, Canada.

For governance purposes it was divided between the local service districts of Keswick Ridge and the parish of Bright, both of which are members of Regional Service Commission 11 (RSC11).

Origin of name
The parish was named in honour of John Bright, recently appointed British President of the Board of Trade at the time.

History
Bright was erected in 1869 from Douglas Parish.

Boundaries
Bright Parish is bounded:

 on the northeast and east by a line beginning on the Carleton County line about 1.5 kilometres northeasterly of Little Forks Brook, then running south 40º east to the mouth of Howard Brook, then down the Keswick River to the Saint John River;
 on the south and southeast by the Saint John River;
 on the southwest by the central line of a two-lot grant to Jonathan Williams, about 675 metres south of the mouth of Currie Brook, then running northwesterly along the Williams line and its prolongation to the Carleton County line at a point about 600 metres northeasterly of Route 104;
 on the northwest by Carleton County.

Communities
Communities at least partly within the parish.

 Barton
 Brewers Mills
 Burtts Corner
 Cahill
 Central Hainesville
 Greenhill
 Hayne
 Howland Ridge
 Jewetts Mills
  Keswick Ridge
 Lower Hainesville
  Mactaquac
 McKeens Corner
 Middle Hainesville
 Morehouse Corner
 Scotch Settlement
 Sisson Settlement
 Tripp Settlement
 Upper Keswick
  Zealand

Bodies of water
Bodies of water at least partly within the parish.

 Keswick River
 Saint John River
 Glooscap Reach
  South Branch Becaguimec Stream
 Little Mactaquac Stream
 Mactaquac Stream
 Mactaquac Stream Basin
 Nackawic Stream
 Alex Creek
 Mill Creek
  Mactaquac Lake
 more than a dozen other officially named lakes

Other notable places
Parks, historic sites, and other noteworthy places at least partly within the parish.
 East Cloverdale Protected Natural Area
 Mactaquac Dam
 Mactaquac Provincial Park
 Otter Brook Protected Natural Area
 Weyman Airpark

Demographics
Revised census figures based on the 2023 local governance reforms have not been released.

Population
Population trend

Language
Mother tongue (2016)

See also
List of parishes in New Brunswick

Notes

References

External links
 York Rural Community Project

Parishes of York County, New Brunswick
Greater Fredericton
Local service districts of York County, New Brunswick